Accident classification is a standardized method in accident analysis by which the causes of an accident, including the root causes, are grouped into categories. Accident classification is mainly used in aviation but can be expanded into other areas, such as railroad or health care. While accident reports are very detailed, the goal of accident classification is to look at a broader picture. By analysing a multitude of accidents and applying the same standardized classification scheme, patterns in how accidents develop can be detected and correlations can be built. The advantage of a standardized accident classification is that statistical methods can be used to gain more insight into accident causation.

A good accident classification system 
 is easy to apply, ideally it is intuitive to use,
 covers as many aspects as possible: human performance, organisational issues, technological issues, Threat and error management, 
 enables the safety experts to recreate the sequence of causal factors and how they correlate with each other.

Accident vs incident classification 
A good accident classification taxonomy is also suitable for incident investigation. The difference between an accident and an incident is the end state. While the end state in an incident is always recoverable, it is not in an accident. Examples for an end state in aviation: in an incident the end state could be a "Controlled Flight Towards Terrain" which is then recovered, while in an accident it would be a "Controlled Flight Into Terrain", which cannot be recovered. The causal factors leading to either one can be analysed with one and the same accident classification system.

Accident classification systems 
 IATA Accident Classification System was developed by members of the IATA Accident Classification Task Force. It is based on the Threat and Error Management Framework of Prof. Helmreich (UT) and Dr. James Klinect. The taxonomy covers the organisation, environmental and airline threats, technical failures, human performance issues and in particular breakdown of communication. The IATA accident classification taxonomy also looks into which prevention strategies could have prevented the accident.
 Human Factors Analysis and Classification System (HFACS) was developed by Wiegman and Shappell. This taxonomy is based on the "Swiss Cheese Model" of Prof. James Reason.

References

External links 
IATA Safety Group and Task Forces
IATA Accident Classification, Article Dr. Dieter Reisinger
 Application of HFACS, Article Wiegman and Shappel

Aviation accidents and incidents
Aviation safety